Mica Cecille Javier-Sillona (born July 29, 1993) is a Filipino actress, singer and model.

Early life
Javier was born in Manila, Philippines, the daughter of businessman and politician Leonardo "Sandy" Javier Jr. Her paternal uncle is Danny Javier of the APO Hiking Society. Javier attended International School Manila (ISM) in Manila and is a 2006 alumna of the two-year NYU Liberal Studies Program (LS), formerly known as the General Studies Program (GSP), and a 2008 alumna of NYU's Gallatin School of Individualized Study.

Career 
Javier started as a commercial and print model while in high school in Manila. Signed under modeling agency Calcarries, she appeared in print ad campaigns for Colgate and Nestea. While at NYU, she modeled for Philippine editions of Women's Health, Cosmopolitan, and Preview, appeared in TV commercials for Whisper, Red Mobile, and Pizza Hut, and interned in marketing and PR for DVF, Adidas Originals, Harper's Bazaar, and Carol's Daughter.

While living in New York City, Javier was signed to modeling agencies BMG Models and MMG Models and appeared in Nolcha Fashion Week. In 2010, she was signed to Timbaland Productions, where her record "3000 Light Years" (produced by Dashawn "Happie" White & Davix Foreman of producing duo Grinehouse) was part of a 75-song deal between Timbaland Productions and Extreme Music Sony/ATV, which was licensed to Fox's hit TV show Glee and Lifetime's hit TV series Dance Moms.

In 2012, Javier moved back to Manila, where she was signed to Homeworkz, a record label owned by Filipino-American R&B singer, Jay R. Her first single, "Tonight", a duet with Jay R, was released in Manila in 2013, went No.1 on Urban Music radio station Wave 89.1 FM, and topped the Pinoy Myx Countdown and the Myx Hit Charts simultaneously. Her second single released in Manila, "Heart Song", also topped high end radio station charts on Monster RX 93.1, while the music video reached Top 10 on Myx Philippines' Pinoy Myx Countdown.

In March 2014, Mica received her first nomination for Favorite Urban Video at the Myx Music Awards. In June 2014, she was also nominated for five categories at the Wave 89.1 Urban Music Awards. Mica won two Urban Music Awards for Best New Artist, as well as Best Collaboration.

From 2016 to 2019, Mica was a member of all girl dance group GirlTrends (now known as GT) on Philippine variety show "It's Showtime" on ABS-CBN.

Personal life 
Javier married Filipino-American R&B singer-songwriter Jay-R on March 1, 2020, in Boracay, Philippines, after a courtship that started in 2012, when Jay R was 31 and Javier aged 27. [Note: Javier's age has been misreported by various Philippine media sources, who cited she was 8 years younger than her real age. This does not align with the dates that were provided previously in the Career section, unless she had started attending NYU at the age of 11.]

References

External link

Living people
Filipino female models
Singers from Manila
1993 births
New York University Gallatin School of Individualized Study alumni
21st-century Filipino singers
21st-century Filipino women singers